"The Bold Canadian" was a patriotic song for Canadians that originated during the War of 1812. It celebrated the conquering of Detroit in Michigan Territory.

History
It is believed that "The Bold Canadian" was written by a private from the Third York Militia's First Flank Company named Cornelius Flummerfelt, who wrote the lines while marching in the Detroit campaign, or on the way back to York, Upper Canada.  The song was used to further increase the numbers of Canadian militia to fight during the war.

Although composed in late 1812, the first publication of the song was not until 1907, when the Niagara Historical Society printed part of the song in a pamphlet about Isaac Brock.  Until 1907, the song was passed down in oral traditions; therefore, different versions of the song came to be.  Full versions of the song were not published until 1927 when the Ontario Historical Society published two different versions of the song.  In 1960, a third version was published; all three varied, with different stanzas and order of stanzas.

Although unpublished, the song remained popular in Canada throughout the nineteenth century, while a comparable American song, "The Hunters of Kentucky", lost its popularity by the end of the Jacksonian Era.

Lyrics

Alternative lyrics
Source

Geoff Berner's "Come All Ye Bold Canadians (Song of the War of 1812)" lyrics
In 2011 Canadian folk-singer Geoff Berner recorded, "Come All Ye Bold Canadians (Song of the War of 1812)," as part of Henry Adam Svec's recording project.

See also

Anthems and nationalistic songs of Canada

References

Further reading

Canadian patriotic songs
1810s songs
Canada in the War of 1812